Piramal Capital and Housing Finance Limited (earlier Dewan Housing Finance Corporation Ltd. (DHFL)) is a non-deposit taking housing finance company, headquartered in Mumbai with branches in major cities across India. DHFL was established to enable access to economical housing finance to the lower and middle income groups in semi-urban and rural parts of India. DHFL is the second housing finance company to be established in the country. The company also leases commercial and residential premises. DHFL is among the 50 biggest financial companies in India.

DHFL is rated ICRA D by ICRA Limited.

History 
DHFL was established and incorporated by Rajesh Kumar Wadhawan on 11 April 1984. The name of the company was changed to Dewan Housing Development Finance Ltd. and later to Dewan Housing Finance Corporation.

In 2010, DHFL acquired Deutsche Postbank Home Finance unit for ₹1079 crores. On 18 December 2013, DHFL acquired 74% stake DHFL Pramerica Life Insurance Company Ltd.

On 29 January 2019, Cobrapost, an Indian investigative journalist group, published an exposé of DHFL for using various shell corporations to siphon more than ₹ 31,000 crores of public money for the personal gains of the DHFL's primary stakeholders: Kapil Wadhawan, Aruna Wadhawan and Dheeraj Wadhawan. In the same article, Cobrapost also raised allegations of political donations worth crores of rupees, in violation of Section 182 of Companies Act, 2013 for political donations. DHFL filed a response with the Bombay Stock Exchange saying the allegations raised by Cobrapost were untrue. DHFL, also rebutted these allegations in a hosted investors / analysts conference and clarified that the ₹ 31,000 crore loans mentioned in the allegation consist of its project loan portfolio. Also the company tried to clarify that the advances commented by Cobrapost should be ₹ 21,000 Crores and not ₹ 31,000 crores. Following the Cobrapost allegations, Indian credit rating agencies reaffirmed their high safety rating for the financial instruments issued by DHFL.

Even after the emergence of serious allegations of misconduct against its business, the Indian credit rating agencies continued to issue high safety ratings for the DHFL financial products, but, on 6 June 2019, DHFL defaulted on its debt repayment, resulting in a debt rating downgrade, immediately wiping out 16% of the value from its stock price. At the time, the fall in DHFL stock price was an all year low. This rapid decline in stock price resulted in a loss of investor confidence.

On 20 November 2019, the Reserve Bank of India removed the board of directors of the company citing corporate governance failure and the company's defaulted payment obligations.

Financial irregularities and probes against DHFL 
In 2019, DHFL stopped payment of bonds and defaulted on its loan obligations. This caused its stock to fall over 97% and a government intervention in the company.

In August 2019, as efforts to draft a resolution plan by restructuring DHFL debt into equity, a few of the DHFL bond holders moved to the debt recovery tribunal, which could impact the resolution process. The company meanwhile offered to repay all investors in full with due process of inter-creditor-agreement.

In October 2019, the Enforcement Directorate conducted raids at several places of DHFL offices and promoter residences and found links of money laundering activity in loans given to firms closely linked to the promoters of the company. Additionally the trail of the loan given by DHFL to Sunblink real estate in 2010 lead to gangster Iqbal Mirchi, an accomplice of the organized crime mastermind Dawood Ibrahim.

On 20 November 2019, under Section 45-IE (I) of the Reserve Bank of India Act, 1934, the Indian central bank removed the board of directors of Dewan Housing Finance Corporation Limited (DHFL). The reasons cited by the banking regulator for the dismissal of the DHFL board of directors were: inadequate governance and the various defaults on its payment obligations.

On 27 January 2020, the promoter of DHFL, Kapil Wadhawan was arrested under the Prevention of Money Laundering Act (PMLA). The arrest was connected to his firm's alleged involvement in providing loans to the organized criminal enterprise of Dawood Ibrahim. On 22 February 2020, the PMLA court granted bail to Kapil Wadhwan. The Bombay high court upheld the bail decision by PMLA court, rejecting Indian Enforcement Directorate requests to stay the bail application.

The ED has linked Yes Bank for various fraud and transactions amounting to 3700 crores as debentures in DHFL. The central bank appointed administrator at Dewan Housing Finance (DHFL) has ordered a transaction audit at the non-bank lender after allegations of money laundering surfaced in the aftermath of the regulatory action on Yes Bank.

On 24 March 2021, CBI filed a new suit against DHFL and its promoters Kapil Wadhawan and Dheeraj Wadhawan, wherein the later were accused of syphoning off the welfare subsidy fund of Pradhan Mantri Awas Yojana by creating 260,000 fake home loan accounts under the same scheme under the guise of a non-existent branch. The suit says, fake loans were granted worth ₹14,046 crore of which ₹11,755.79 crore were routed to shell corporations and citing these loans, subsidy amounts were claimed under Pradhan Mantri Awas Yojana.

Operations 
, DHFL has 209 branches and 113 service centres. It also has a representative office in London.

References 

Housing finance companies of India
Companies listed on the National Stock Exchange of India
Companies listed on the Bombay Stock Exchange